Jessup's Mill, also known as Stokes County Union Milling Company, is historic grist mill, standing on the banks of the Dan River, in the community of Collinstown in northwest Stokes County, North Carolina.  It was built in 1910, and is a tall 3 1/2-story, rectangular, heavy timber frame building sheathed in weatherboard.  Associated with the mill are the contributing warming room; the original miller's house, also known as "honeymoon cottage"; and outhouse.

It was added to the National Register of Historic Places in 1982.

References

Industrial buildings completed in 1910
Buildings and structures in Stokes County, North Carolina
Grinding mills in North Carolina
Grinding mills on the National Register of Historic Places in North Carolina
National Register of Historic Places in Stokes County, North Carolina